Leigh Daniel (born August 6, 1978, in Lubbock, Texas) is the 
former head coach of the women's cross country program and assistant track and field coach at Ashland University in Ohio (2005-2010). She also is an American track athlete specializing in long-distance running and fitness trainer in Lubbock.

Collegiate Running Career

During her days as a college athlete at Texas Tech, Daniel had several top-three finishes in NCAA championship races and won numerous titles in the Big 12 Conference. Daniel's victory in the 1999 NCAA outdoor  10000 metres immediately took on legendary status among track and field observers, as one of her shoes came off during the race and she had to stop to put it back on, thus ceding an estimated 120 metres to her opponents.

TODAY Throws a Wedding contest
On July 1, 2009, Daniel and fiancé Nick Cordes won first place in the TODAY contest TODAY Throws a Wedding. As a result, the two wed on July 15, 2009, in a ceremony televised on TODAY.

References

External links
Leigh Daniel biosketch on Cardinal's Sporting Goods list of fitness trainers

American female long-distance runners
Texas Tech Red Raiders women's track and field athletes
Universiade medalists in athletics (track and field)
1978 births
Living people
Ashland Eagles cross country coaches
Ashland Eagles track and field coaches
Universiade gold medalists for the United States
Medalists at the 1999 Summer Universiade